9/6 may refer to:
September 6 (month-day date notation)
June 9 (day-month date notation)